The Rainmakers is the debut album by the Rainmakers, produced by Terry Manning and released in 1986. It is their highest-charting album on the Billboard albums chart, reaching No. 85, and contains the single "Let My People Go-Go", which reached No. 18 on the UK Singles Chart.

A remastered version of the album was released in 2010 with 4 additional bonus tracks.

Track listing

Personnel

The Rainmakers 
Bob Walkenhorst - lead vocals, acoustic guitar
Rich Ruth - bass, vocals
Steve Phillips - electric guitar, vocals, lead vocal on "Nobody Knows"
Pat Tomek - drums

Additional musicians 
Terry Manning - keyboards
The Memphis Horns

Charts

Singles

Notes 

1986 debut albums
Mercury Records albums
The Rainmakers (band) albums